Chandler is a discontinued personal information management software suite described by its developers as a "Note-to-Self Organizer" designed for personal and small-group task management and calendaring. It is free software, previously released under the GNU General Public License, and  now released under the Apache License 2.0. It is inspired by a PIM from the 1980s called Lotus Agenda, notable because of its "free-form" approach to information management. Lead developer of Agenda, Mitch Kapor, was also involved in the vision and management of Chandler.

Chandler consists of a cross-platform desktop application (Windows, Mac OS X, Linux), the Chandler Hub Sharing Service, Chandler Server, Chandler Quick Entry for iPhone, and Chandler Quick Entry for Android. Version 1.0 of the software was released on August 8, 2008.

Chandler was developed by the Open Source Applications Foundation (OSAF). It is named after the mystery novelist Raymond Chandler.

Chandler design goals 
Chandler aimed to create a workflow for personal information management different from that in other PIMs. Its approach is mainly based in creating a unified representation for the storage of tasks and information so that they can be classified in a homogeneous way, refining that information through an iterative workflow, and allowing easy collaboration on the defined items. Other goals included:
 Build on open source software that supports open standards, choosing projects that are reliable, well documented, and widely used
 Use the Python language at the top level to orchestrate low level, higher performance code
 Design a platform that supports an extensible modular architecture
 For the desktop client, choose a cross-platform user interface toolkit that provides native user experience
 Use a persistent object database
 Build in security from the ground up
 Build an architecture that supports sharing, communication, and collaboration

Reception 
The first public releases of Chandler generated expectations to provide a flexible and general information management tool, because of its heritage of concepts from Agenda and usage of principles from the Getting Things Done management method. Early responses praised its open nature and 
its unified approach to management of different information types. 

Despite this, the lack of a stable version and the small developer base diminished public interest in the project. In January 2008, Mitch Kapor  announced that he was leaving the board and would only finance Chandler until the end of 2008. After that, OSAF released a 1.0 version. Jake Edge from LWN.net called this move a "last gasp attempt to build a community of users and developers to continue Chandler development down the road", speculating that the lack of developers was caused by the close control of the project by OSAF, and this end of its funding could attract attention again.

There have been no releases since 2009.

In popular culture
Chandler is the subject of the non-fiction book Dreaming in Code: Two Dozen Programmers, Three Years, 4732 Bugs, and One Quest for Transcendent Software by Scott Rosenberg.

See also
List of personal information managers
Internet Systems Consortium (ISC)
Task Coach

References

Citations

Sources 

 Attribution
 Portions of this article are taken from the OSAF website, published under the Creative Commons Attribution License v2.0.

External links

 
  (better mirror with all metadata, branches, and tags preserved on Gitlab)
 Project videopresentations on YouTube

Free personal information managers
Free software programmed in Python
Personal information manager software for Linux
Free calendaring software
Software that uses wxPython
2008 software